The Babcock-Shattuck House (also known as the Jewish War Veterans Post) is a prominent house at the corner of East Genesee and Westcott Streets in Syracuse, New York.

Description and history 
The Queen Anne-style house was built in the mid-1890s to be the home of Dr. Archer D. Babcock, a founding member of the Crouse-Irving Hospital. It was Babcock's home until 1913.

Beginning during World War II, it was a post of the Jewish War Veterans of the United States of America. They converted the second floor into a large meeting room. During the tenure of this organization, the house played an important role in the Jewish community of Syracuse.

It was listed on the National Register of Historic Places on May 12, 2004.

References

External links 

Photo of "Former Jewish Home", at SyracuseThenAndNow
Samuel D. Gruber, New Hope for Former Babcock-Shattuck House / Jewish War Veterans' Post (Feb 26, 2012)
Tim Knauss, "Finally, renovation begins at historic house on Syracuse's East Side" (Jan 14, 2013)
Samuel D. Gruber, Renovation of Babcock-Shattuck House (former Jewish War Veterans' Post) Begins (Jan. 15, 2013)
Samuel D. Gruber, Babcock-Shattuck House (former Jewish War Veterans' Post) Work Progresses (Aug 1, 2013)

Houses on the National Register of Historic Places in New York (state)
Houses in Syracuse, New York
National Register of Historic Places in Syracuse, New York